is a national beauty pageant in Japan.

History
The Miss World Japan contest was started in 2013, by national holder for Miss World in Tokyo, Japan. The winner of Miss World Japan (MWJ) represents her country at Miss World. On occasion, when the winner does not qualify (due to age) for either contest, a runner-up is sent.

Titleholders
Color key

See also 

 Miss World
 Miss Universe Japan
 Miss International Japan
 Miss Earth Japan
 Miss Japan
 Miss Nippon
Japan at major beauty pageants

References

External links
  

Japan
Beauty pageants in Japan
Recurring events established in 2013
2013 establishments in Japan
Japanese awards